The 2005–06 Elite Women's Hockey League season was the second season of the Elite Women's Hockey League, a multi-national women's ice hockey league. HC Slovan Bratislava of Slovakia won the league title.

First round

Northeast Division

Southwest Division

9th-11th place

Playoffs

3rd place
HC Eagles Bozen - Agordo Hockey 2:0

5th-8th place

Qualification
EC Ravens Salzburg - UTE Marilyn Budapest 2:0
Ferencvaros Stars Budapest - DEC Dragons Klagenfurt 2:0

5th place
EC Ravens Salzburg - Ferencvaros Stars Budapest 2:0

7th place
DEC Dragons Klagenfurt - UTE Marilyn Budapest 2:0

External links
Season on hockeyarchives.info

Women
European Women's Hockey League seasons
Euro